Jody Hull (born February 2, 1969) is a Canadian former professional ice hockey winger who serves as the associate coach for the Tri City Americans  of the Western Hockey League  Was Head coach of Peterborough Petes from December 2012 to January 2018. Hull was born in Petrolia, Ontario, but grew up in Cambridge, Ontario.

Playing career
Hull was drafted in the first-round, 18th overall by the Hartford Whalers in the 1987 NHL Entry Draft. In addition to Hartford, Hull also played for the New York Rangers, Ottawa Senators, Florida Panthers, Tampa Bay Lightning and the Philadelphia Flyers between 1988 and 2004. He played 831 regular season games in total, scoring 124 goals and 137 assists for 261 points and collecting 156 penalty minutes. He also played 69 playoff games, scoring 9 points and 14 penalty minutes.

Career statistics

Regular season and playoffs

International

References

External links
 

1969 births
Binghamton Rangers players
Binghamton Senators players
Binghamton Whalers players
Canadian ice hockey right wingers
Florida Panthers players
Grand Rapids Griffins players
Hartford Whalers draft picks
Hartford Whalers players
Ice hockey people from Ontario
Living people
National Hockey League first-round draft picks
New York Rangers players
Orlando Solar Bears (IHL) players
Ottawa Senators players
People from Lambton County
Peterborough Petes (ice hockey) players
Philadelphia Flyers players
Sportspeople from Cambridge, Ontario
Tampa Bay Lightning players